Stan Openshaw (10 August, 1946 – 19 May, 2022) was a British geographer. His last post was professor of human geography based in the School of Geography at the University of Leeds. After eighteen years at Newcastle University, including three years as professor of quantitative geography, he moved to work in Leeds in 1992. Openshaw was a researcher in computer-based/computational geography and his work aimed to automate aspects of geographical research and reduce subjectivity in geographical analyses. He worked on geographical information systems, analysis technology and models. He debated the direction geography should take putting forward a view that the subject needed an applied and scientific edge that harnessed the growing power of computers to make positive impacts to help us avoid and mitigate risk and cope better with disasters.

In 1992 Openshaw set up the Centre for Computational Geography (CCG) as an inter-disciplinary unit at the University of Leeds; it is a research unit dedicated to the use computers for exploring complex social and physical problems.  He also became a fellow of the Institute of Statisticians and a member of the British Computer Society in 1983, as well as a fellow of the Royal Geographical Society and a Chartered Statistician in 1993. Openshaw had directed the CCG for seven years until he had a stroke and finally retired in 1999 . Because of his severe medical condition/sequelae, Openshaw struggled to communicate verbally and got around from 1999.

In 2012 at the GISRUK conference in Lancaster a special session was arranged to celebrate his work and geographical career.

Education
 PhD, Geography, Newcastle University, 1974
 B.A. (first class) honours degree, Geography, Newcastle University, 1968
 Openshaw was a pupil at Argyle House School in Sunderland

Scholarship
Openshaw's "Southern – East Lothian" B.A. Honours Geography Thesis has six chapters describing the physical and socio-economic geography of the region in the south east of Scotland. It contains tables of data, maps, aerial and ground level photographs, diagrams, statistical analysis, considerable description and details of two surveys (one about tourism which Openshaw aimed at tourists in Dunbar, and another about agriculture which Openshaw aimed at farmers). It may be that there is more than one copy of this thesis produced in 1968 and submitted to Newcastle University, but it would not be surprising for Openshaw to have kept a copy. A copy is stored with other artefacts of Openshaw's in a collection called "The Stan Openshaw Collection" the physical manifestation of which resides for the time being at the University of Leeds.

Openshaw's "Processes in urban morphology with special reference to South Shields" PhD Thesis is archived at the British Library as microfilm no. : D10191/74. The thesis submitted to Newcastle University was completed in December 1973. It was compiled over several years (and for at least the latter part) whilst Openshaw worked in the Planning Department at Durham County Council. Openshaw wrote an abstract of the thesis and kept it with his copy of the work. The abstract has now been reproduced on-line on his CCG PhD Web Page.

Openshaw's research career blossomed in the Department of Town and Country Planning at Newcastle University, where, during the 1970s he worked on zone design methodology, for regional based administration, and for the analysis of socio-economic data in geographical and planning contexts. During the same period he developed a way to estimate death or kill rates of various nuclear bombing strategies evolving computerised techniques for identifying locations with the highest concentration of something. In the 1980s he pioneered the use of multimedia geographical information systems by spearheading the BBC Domesday Project.

Openshaw strove to remove human bias from the scientific process and was a strong believer in human-competitive machine intelligence. In the late 1980s and through the 1990s he worked to develop automated geographical analysis tools and "geographical explanation machines", which aimed to assist human researchers in the formation of hypotheses about the causes of geographical clusters and patterns in data. Openshaw introduced genetic programming to geography and demonstrated the predictive capabilities of artificial intelligence techniques and the modelling and inference capabilities of fuzzy logic. Perhaps his best known contributions, however, were to the field of geodemographics and location modelling, working on the classification of groups of people and the development of spatial interaction model technology for analysing networks of demand and supply.

In 1996, as the World Wide Web began to blossom, Openshaw encouraged a growing global community of computational geographers to meet for a first international GeoComputation conference which was hosted at the University of Leeds in 1997. The event was a great success and initialised a series of international conferences that is still on-going (see the GeoComputation Conference Series Home Page for details).

Books
 Openshaw, S., Abrahart, R.J. (2000) Geocomputation
 Openshaw, S., Turton, I. (2000) High performance computing and the art of parallel programming: An introduction for |-
 Stillwell, J.C.H, Geertman S., Openshaw, S. (1999) Geographical information and planning
 Openshaw, S., Openshaw, C. (1997) Artificial intelligence in geography
 Openshaw, S. (1995) Census users' handbook
 Openshaw, S., Carver, S., Fernie J. (1989) Britain's nuclear waste: siting and safety
 Openshaw, S. (1986) Nuclear power: siting and safety
 Openshaw, S., Steadman, P., Greene, O. (1983) Doomsday: Britain after nuclear attack
 Openshaw, S. (1978) Doomsday: Britain after nuclear attack

PhD students

External links

Stan Openshaw's CCG Home Web Page
Stan Openshaw's Old School of Geography Web Page Retrieved from the Internet Archive Way Back Machine

References 

1946 births
2022 deaths
British geographers
Academics of Newcastle University
Academics of the University of Leeds
Alumni of Newcastle University
Fellows of the Royal Geographical Society
Members of the British Computer Society
Geographic information scientists